Anna Cummer (born January 2, 1977) is a Canadian actress. She was born in Singapore to Canadian parents. She spent half of her adolescence in Southeast Asia and the other half in Saskatoon, Saskatchewan, Canada. She finished high school in Hong Kong at the French International School of Hong Kong and studied drama in England where she completed the Master of Performing Arts. Since returning to Canada in 2001, Cummer has put her talents to good use as a voiceover artist, working in film and television, and performing in theatrical productions. As a voice actress, Cummer is best known as the voice of Mea from Popotan, Nozomi Daichi from The Daichis and Miyu Kuroi from the Mega Man NT Warrior series.

As a theatre actress, Cummer is a recipient of several Jessie nominations and awards.

She is also voiced in English dub, Shinbi from The Haunted House series.

Roles

Anime 

  – Shinbi
 Cardfight!! Vanguard G: Stride Gate – Girl (ep 41); Ryuzu Child (ep 38); Ryuzu Myojin (Child)
 Cardfight!! Vanguard G: Z – Gredora
 Dokkoida?! – Mrs. Umeki; Assistant; Sister #4; Reporter
 Future Card Buddyfight X – Chibi Panda; Newscaster (ep 2)
 Galaxy Angel – Vanilla H
 Hamtaro – Postie
 Human Crossing – Kyoko Tamura; Miss Ryoko
 Infinite Ryvius – Fangirl; Dicastia Crewmember; Cafeteria Girl
 Inuyasha – Serina (Episode 59)
 Maison Ikkoku – Kozue Nanao (second voice); Yagami's Classmate 3
 Master Keaton – Ann MacRae
 MegaMan NT Warrior – Miyu Kuroi/Mysteriyu
 Mobile Suit Gundam SEED – Miriallia Haw
 Mobile Suit Gundam 00 – Kinue Crossroad
 Popotan – Mea (Ocean / Geneon)
 Starship Operators – Rio Mamiya
 Shakugan no Shana – Wirhelmina Carmel (Season 1)
 The Daichis - Earth's Defense Family – Nozomi Daichi; Lieutenant

Film and television 
 Human Target – Female Hostage (Episode: The Pilot)
 Care Bears: Share Bear Shines – Princess Starglo (voice)
 Smallville – Passing Reporter (Episode: Hex)
 Strawberry Shortcake's Berry Bitty Adventures – Strawberry Shortcake (voice)
 Barbie Presents: Thumbelina – Thumbelina (voice)
 Reaper – Female Customer (Episode: The Favorite)
 Iron Man: Armored Adventures – Patricia "Pepper" Potts / Rescue (voice)
 Aliens in America – Mrs. Quercioli (Episode: The Muslim Card)
 Sheltered Life – Anna
 Eureka – EMT Nurse (Episode: God is in the Details)
 Monster Buster Club – Samantha (voice)
Inuyasha the Movie: Fire on the Mystic Island - Kujaku
 My Little Pony: A Very Pony Place – Star Light & Heart Bright (voice)
 My Little Pony: Pinkie Pie's Special Day - Rainbow Dash (voice)
 The Barbie Diaries – Dawn (voice)
 Stargate Atlantis – Petra (Episode: The Tower)
 Just Cause – Julie (Episode: The Wives of Christmas Past)
 John Doe – Spectacles (Episode: Do, Re: Me)
 The World of Piwi — Maureen (1st voice)
 Frequency Zero – Waitress
 The Miracles of the Cards – Nurse Theresa
 Barbie: Princess Charm School – Caprice
 Hydee and the Hytops (2011 movie) - Charolette (voice)
 The Passage of Fiona – Morgan

Theatre 
 Hedda Gabler – Hedda (Osimous Theatre)
 Intimate Apparel – Mrs. Van Buren (Arts Club Theatre Company)
 Snowman – Kim (Rumble Productions)
 Death of a Salesman – Jenny/Letta (Vancouver Playhouse)
 The Miracle Worker – Annie Sullivan (Vancouver Playhouse)
 The Secret World of Og – Penny (Carousel Theatre)
 Coriolanus – Aufidius (Coriolanus Co-op)
 How It Works – Brooke (Touchstone Theatre – Nominated for Best Supporting Actress)
 Hecuba – Polyxena (Blackbird Theatre)
 Recovery – Mya (Rumble Productions)
 The Winter's Tale – Perdita (Bard on the Beach)
 Troilus and Cressida – Cassandra (Bard on the Beach)
 Titus Andronicus – Lavinia (Mad Duck Theatre Collective)
 Peter Pan – Wendy Darling (Carousel Theatre – Nominated for Outstanding Performance)
 The Diary of Anne Frank – Margot Frank (Arts Club Theatre Company)
 Portia, My Love – Portia (Ensemble Theatre)
 Goodnight Desdemona (Good Morning Juliet) – Juliet (One Night Castle Projects – Won Best Supporting Actress Award)
 The Tempest – Miranda (Mad Duck Theatre Collective)
 Shopping & Fucking – Lulu (Pi Theatre/Ruby Slippers)

Video games 
 Dynasty Warriors: Gundam 2 – Cecily Fairchild
 Dynasty Warriors: Gundam 3 – Cecily Fairchild

References

External links 
 
 Anna Cummer's website

1977 births
Living people
Actresses from Saskatoon
Actresses from Vancouver
Canadian expatriates in Hong Kong
Canadian expatriates in Singapore
Canadian expatriates in England
Canadian film actresses
Canadian stage actresses
Canadian television actresses
Canadian voice actresses
Singaporean emigrants to Canada